Bonnetta may refer to:

People 
 Jonas Bonnetta, Canadian singer and songwriter, member of Evening Hymns
 Rachel Bonnetta, Canadian reporter and television host

Ships 
 Bonnetta, UK ship that foundered in the North Sea in 26 March 1836